On May 28, 1995, Sinedu Tadesse, a junior at Harvard College, stabbed her roommate, Trang Phuong Ho, to death, then committed suicide. The incident may have resulted in changes to living conditions at Harvard.

Background
Sinedu Tadesse was born on September 25, 1975, in Addis Ababa, Ethiopia.  She grew up in a relatively well-off family. However, this period in Ethiopia's history was turbulent. Her father had been jailed for two years when Tadesse was aged about seven. She was ostracized by other students as well as her own family members during her childhood years in Ethiopia. Tadesse then devoted herself to her studies, gaining admission to the prestigious International Community School, where she graduated as valedictorian and was admitted to Harvard.

At Harvard, Tadesse maintained a B average grade—too low for admittance to Harvard Medical School, but likely high enough to get into other good medical schools. She made no friends, remaining distant even from relatives she had in the area. Tadesse sent a form letter to dozens of strangers that she picked from the phone book, describing her unhappiness and pleading with them to be her friend. One woman responded to the letter but became alarmed by the bizarre writings and recordings Tadesse sent her in return; she had no further contact with Tadesse. Another woman found the letter obnoxious and sent it to a friend who worked at Harvard to review.

After her freshman year, her roommate told her she was going to room with someone else. For her second and third years, Tadesse roomed with Trang Ho, a Vietnamese student who was well liked and doing well at Harvard, and Tadesse was obsessively fond of her. Tadesse was very needy in her demands for attention and became angry when Ho began to distance herself in their junior year. Tadesse apparently reacted with despair when Ho announced her decision to room with another group of girls their senior year, and the two women stopped speaking.

Killing of Trang Ho and suicide
Tadesse purchased two knives and rope, and the week before she killed Ho she sent a photograph of herself with an anonymous note to The Harvard Crimson, saying "Keep this picture. There will soon be a very juicy story involving this woman." She took one final exam, but got medical exemptions for two others, and had a brunch date with a fellow Ethiopian student, who later said he realized she was saying goodbye to him.

On May 28, 1995, Tadesse stabbed her roommate Ho 45 times with a hunting knife, killing her. Tadesse also attacked one of Ho's visiting friends, a 26-year-old named Thao Nguyen, severely injuring her as well.  Tadesse then hanged herself in the bathroom.

Tadesse is buried at the Ethiopian Orthodox Cemetery, Addis Ababa, Ethiopia.

Aftermath

It was speculated on campus and in the press that Tadesse had resorted to violence because Ho had asked not to room with her again in the fall. Members of Tadesse's family countered that she was the one who opted out of rooming with Ho, as she was often alone in the dormitory because Ho often stayed with her family in nearby Medford, Massachusetts.

Trang Ho's family thought Harvard could have prevented her death. In 1998, they filed suit against the school, alleging "wrongful death, conscious pain and suffering and emotional distress," and charging the university, as well as various people in charge at Dunster House, with negligence. They felt that the university had plenty of evidence that Tadesse was losing her mind and becoming fixated on violent vengeance, and that the university could have prevented the deaths.

The Trang Ho Public Service Fellowship was established to pay for a student to perform charitable work during the summer after junior year.

In popular culture
In 1997, Melanie Thernstrom, who had graduated from Harvard in 1987 and taught creative writing there, published a nonfiction book about the case and its aftermath, Halfway Heaven: Diary of a Harvard Murder, which was sharply critical of how Harvard handled the crime. She also detailed several instances of Harvard students with mental health issues having their situations exacerbated by unsympathetic university officials and ineffective advisors.

Thernstrom traveled to Tadesse's home in Ethiopia and gained access to her diaries, which revealed her deteriorating mental health, her obsessive fantasizing about an ideal friend, and her attempts to find effective psychiatric care.

References

Murder–suicides in the United States
1995 murders in the United States
Crimes in Massachusetts
May 1995 events in the United States
Murder in Massachusetts